Samuel William Yorty (October 1, 1909 – June 5, 1998) was an American politician, attorney, and radio host from Los Angeles, California. He served as a member of the United States House of Representatives and the California State Assembly, but he is most remembered for his turbulent three terms as the 37th Mayor of Los Angeles from 1961 to 1973. Though Yorty spent almost all of his political career as a Democrat, he became a Republican in 1980.

Early life

Sam Yorty was born and raised in Lincoln, Nebraska, the son of Frank Patrick and Johanna (Egan) Yorty. His paternal grandfather was Pennsylvania Dutch, while the rest of his ancestors were Irish, his mother being a native of Clonmel, Ireland. He began his political education as the son of a Democratic father in a Republican state, with a mother who also showed a strong interest in politics. The family moved to Southern California when Yorty completed high school.

Yorty enrolled at Southwestern University and later the University of California at Los Angeles, working for a time at the Los Angeles Department of Water and Power. He was admitted to the bar in 1939.

Elected as a Democrat to the California State Assembly in 1936, Yorty established himself as a politician with integrity, but watched his popularity plummet when he reported a bribery attempt on a pending bill. Yorty advocated state ownership of public utilities and strong labor unions, showing a liberal approach to politics. His support of the Republicans in Spain's civil war against General Francisco Franco and his fight against using the California Highway Patrol to end labor strikes helped earn him support of the local Communist Party United States of America organization. That support haunted Yorty in 1938, when he was branded a communist by Folsom Prison inmate Arthur Kent during testimony before the House Un-American Activities Committee. Kent, who claimed to have been a local membership chairman of the Communist Party, proved to be untrustworthy and Yorty was vindicated. That episode, plus the refusal of the local Communist Party to endorse him for mayor of Los Angeles that year, began a shift of Yorty's political beliefs.

Losing a 1940 bid for U.S. Senator, when he ran unsuccessfully as a liberal internationalist against isolationist Republican and longtime incumbent Hiram Johnson, Yorty left politics during World War II to serve in the United States Army Air Corps in the Pacific Theater, attaining the rank of captain in the Intelligence Branch. He resumed his Assembly seat after his discharge. He was elected to the United States House of Representatives in 1950 and was reelected in 1952, but again lost his race for the U.S. Senate in 1954. In that special election for the two years remaining of the term of Richard M. Nixon, Yorty received 1,788,071 votes (45.5%) to Senator Thomas H. Kuchel's 2,090,831 (53.2%). Kuchel, a liberal Republican, had been appointed to the seat in 1953 by then-Governor of California Earl Warren when Nixon became vice president.

Mayoralty

In 1960, Yorty endorsed fellow Californian Richard Nixon over Massachusetts Senator and fellow Democrat John F. Kennedy for president. This angered many in the Democratic Party.

Although municipal elections in California are non-partisan, the resources of the party were directed against him when he ran for mayor of Los Angeles the following year against incumbent Republican Norris Poulson. The bitter campaign was marked by Poulson's claim that Yorty was backed by members of organized crime, a comment that caused Yorty to sue Poulson for $3.3 million.

Yorty prevailed, however, running as a populist. He railed against "a little ruling clique" of "downtown interests" and promised to revise the city charter, which had become unwieldy with the city's growth from a quiet West Coast town to the third largest metropolis in the country. He was a strong advocate of expanding the freeway network. Perhaps his most popular promise was to end residents' sorting of wet and dry garbage; dry garbage was typically burned in backyard incinerators which contributed to the city's notorious smog. There had been two independent collections: wet garbage (including food waste), and bottles and cans; dry combustible trash was burned in incinerators until Los Angeles County ordered an end to backyard trash burning in 1957, when Poulson was still mayor. After that, there were three collections: wet garbage, bottles and cans, and dry garbage.

He made good on his waste management and highway promises, and oversaw the emergence of Los Angeles as a major city. He was a backer of the Los Angeles Music Center, business districts such as Little Tokyo, and of the Los Angeles Zoo. He also made frequent appearances on The Tonight Show Starring Johnny Carson, which boosted his popularity. At the same time, he was a passionate anti-Communist, a critic of the Civil Rights Movement, and an outspoken opponent of desegregation busing and feminism.

In 1965, Yorty was reelected over Democratic Congressman James Roosevelt, son of the late President Franklin D. Roosevelt. Roosevelt's campaign put up hundreds of billboards, handed out bales of bumper stickers and buttons, appeared often on television with 15-minute and half-hour shows, and was featured in so many other spots that his large presence in electronic media was criticized. Roosevelt's campaign cost around $450,000, but Yorty spent less than half that amount. Roosevelt called Yorty a stooge of Democrat Jesse "Big Daddy" Unruh, the controversial California Assembly speaker. He attacked Yorty's membership in a segregated private club and repeatedly criticized Yorty for having a bad temper. The often-irascible Yorty held his temper throughout the campaign, seeming almost cool in contrast to Roosevelt. He pointed to the fact that he had cut city taxes, streamlined city government and improved garbage pickups. He outpolled Roosevelt 392,775 (57.9 percent) to 247,313 (36.5 percent), with the remainder of votes going to six other candidates on the ballot.

Although Yorty was the first mayor to have a female deputy, Marion W. La Follette, and the first to have a racially integrated staff, his appeal did not extend to most of the city's large African-American population. Disaffection with high unemployment and racism contributed to the Watts Riots of August 11–17, 1965. Yorty's administration was criticized for failing to cooperate with efforts to improve conditions in neighborhoods such as Watts, but he accused other leaders of raising false hopes and of action by Communist agitators, having always categorically rejected any criticism of the city's police or fire departments.

After the riots, Yorty challenged incumbent Democratic Governor Edmund G. (Pat) Brown in the 1966 gubernatorial primary. He received 981,088 votes (37.6%) to Brown's 1,355,262 (51.9). Yorty's politics shifted toward the right. This change became evident when he joined the election-night celebration of Brown's successful opponent, Ronald W. Reagan. Yorty went to Vietnam to support the American troops and was thereafter dubbed "Saigon Sam" by his liberal opponents.

In 1967, Yorty was forced to deal with scandal after the Los Angeles Times published an exposé on the city's harbor commission. The investigation led to the indictment and conviction of four city commissioners for bribery, while another was found dead in Los Angeles Harbor. The newspaper, which had long feuded with the mayor, noted that all of the individuals had been appointed by Yorty.

Support among the white middle classes fell after Yorty was embroiled in the controversy following the 1968 assassination of Robert F. Kennedy at the Ambassador Hotel. Yorty outraged prosecutors in the case by freely commenting on the evidence. Kennedy had told his supporters only moments before he was shot, "Mayor Yorty has just sent me a message that we've been here too long already."  

During the fall of 1968, Yorty refused to endorse Democratic presidential candidate Hubert Humphrey. The strategy behind this approach was that Yorty would be rewarded with a cabinet post by Richard Nixon for his lack of support of Humphrey, but Nixon declined to offer him a position in the new administration. Continuing their adversarial relationship, the Times published an editorial cartoon by Paul Conrad lampooning this failure and Yorty responded with an unsuccessful lawsuit.

In the 1969 mayoral primary, Yorty's popularity slipped well below that of Los Angeles City Council member Tom Bradley.  The ensuing campaign between Yorty and Bradley, directed for Yorty by Henry Salvatori, proved one of the most bitter in the city's history. Yorty painted his opponent as a dangerous radical, alternately of the black power or Communist revolutionary varieties. The charges were not plausible since Bradley had spent much of his career in the Los Angeles Police Department, but they resonated among fearful voters, and Yorty was re-elected.  

Despite winning another four years, Yorty showed obvious signs of boredom in his position. He ran again for governor in 1970 but was handily defeated in the Democratic primary by State Assembly Speaker Jesse Unruh, 1,602,690 (61.4 percent) to 659,494 (26.3 percent). Unruh in turn was defeated by Reagan, who secured his second term as governor by a narrower margin than his 1966 majority over Pat Brown. Yorty began to leave all but the most important decisions to his staff.

After spending almost 40 percent of his time away from Los Angeles during the last half of 1971, Yorty announced on November 15 of that year that he was running for the Democratic nomination for President in 1972. Yorty had received strong support from influential New Hampshire publisher William Loeb, stating that President Nixon had "caved in" to anti-war senators and that he had never agreed with the government's policy on the war. In response to the question of what he would do, Yorty noted that Dwight Eisenhower had helped bring an end to the Korean War by threatening to use nuclear weapons.

However, Yorty received just six percent of the vote in the New Hampshire primary and was never able to gain any momentum in his bid for the nomination. He finally ended his bid shortly before the California primary in June 1972, asking voters to support Humphrey because of the "radical" nature of anti-Vietnam War candidate George McGovern. Yorty picked up the support of a young Louisiana delegate to the Democratic convention, Louis E. "Woody" Jenkins. After McGovern won the Democratic nomination for president, Yorty began to support Republicans.

Yorty's previous race-baiting demagoguery came back to haunt him in 1973, when Bradley soundly defeated him in a rematch of their 1969 race. In 1974, he ran fourth in another bid for governor in the Democratic primary, far behind then-Secretary of State Jerry Brown, son of Pat Brown.

Later career
After leaving office, Yorty hosted a talk show on KCOP-TV for five years, later complaining that he was canceled in favor of the television program Hee Haw. After leaving work on the small screen, he returned to the political arena, but failed in a comeback bid for the Republican nomination for the U.S. Senate in 1980, having been defeated by the conservative Paul Gann, who in turn was badly beaten by incumbent liberal Democrat Alan Cranston. In 1981, Yorty failed again in a bid to unseat Bradley.

Afterward, Yorty retired from public life, aside from being a rainmaker for several law firms. He suffered a stroke on May 24, 1998, then contracted pneumonia. After treatment at the Encino-Tarzana Regional Medical Center, he was sent to his Studio City, California home, where he died on the morning of June 5, the 30th anniversary of Robert Kennedy's assassination and three months before Yorty's old rival, Tom Bradley, died. Prior to his death, Yorty had told his wife that he wanted no funeral service.

Legacy
A 1993 survey of historians, political scientists and urban experts conducted by Melvin G. Holli of the University of Illinois at Chicago saw Rizzo ranked as the ninth-worst American big-city mayor to serve between the years 1820 and 1993. When the survey was limited only to mayors that were in office post-1960, the results saw Rizzo ranked as the third-worst.

See also
Eighty-second United States Congress
Eighty-third United States Congress
 Membership discrimination in California social clubs
Norris Poulson
Marguerite P. Justice, the second woman, and the first black woman to be named to the Los Angeles Police Commission, appointed by Yorty.
Tom Bradley
Watts Riots
 City Council President L.E. Timberlake, often the acting mayor while Yorty was away from the state

References

Further reading

External links
 Time: Mayor Yorty Cover, September 2, 1966
 "Yorty's Chortle", Time Magazine. April 16, 1965
 Author, Jennifer. "Sam Yorty Dead At 88", CNN, June 5, 1998
 Meyerson, Harold. "Sam Yorty, 1909-1998", LA Weekly, June 12, 1998 Sam Yorty, 1909-1998
 Pearson, Richard. "Combative Politician Sam Yorty Dies at 88", The Washington Post, June 7, 1998
Oral history interview on California politics Political advocacy and loyalty : oral history transcripts / and related material, 1977-1982
City of Los Angeles archives for the Yorty administration 
Join California Sam Yorty

1909 births
1998 deaths
20th-century American politicians
California Democrats
California Republicans
Candidates in the 1964 United States presidential election
Candidates in the 1972 United States presidential election
Candidates in the 1981 United States elections
Democratic Party members of the United States House of Representatives
Mayors of Los Angeles
Members of the California State Assembly
Members of the United States House of Representatives from California
Military personnel from California
People from Studio City, Los Angeles
Politicians from Lincoln, Nebraska
United States Army Air Forces officers
United States Army Air Forces personnel of World War II